Yonsei University is a private research university in Seoul, South Korea. As a member of the "SKY" universities, Yonsei University is deemed one of the three most prestigious institutions in the country. It is particularly respected in the studies of medicine and business administration.

The student body consists of 26,731 undergraduate students, 11,994 graduate students, 4,518 faculty members, 6,788 staff, and 257,931 alumni. Yonsei operates its main campus in Seoul and offers graduate, postgraduate and doctoral programs in Korean and English.

The university was established in January 1957 through the union of Yonhi College (연희전문학교; 延禧專門學校) and Severance Union Medical College (세브란스 의과대학; 세브란스 醫科大學). This was a result of a lasting bilateral cooperation between the colleges that began in the 1920s. The institutions were the first of their kinds in Korea. Yonhi College was one of the first modern colleges, founded as Chosun Christian College (조선기독교대학; 朝鮮基督教大學) in March 1915. Severance has its roots in the first modern medical center in Korea, Gwanghyewon (광혜원 廣惠院, House of Extended Grace), founded in April, 1885. As a tribute, the name "Yonsei" was derived from the first syllables of the names of its two parent institutions, "Yon; 연; 延" from Yonhi College and "Sei; 세; 世" from Severance Union Medical College.

History

Beginnings (1885–1916) 

The Yonsei University Medical School dates to April 10, 1885, when the first modern hospital to practice Western medicine in Korea, Gwanghyewon, was established.

The hospital was founded by Horace Newton Allen, the American Protestant missionary appointed to Korea by the Presbyterian Church in the USA. The hospital was renamed Chejungwon (제중원 濟衆院, House of Universal Helpfulness) on April 26. As there appeared difficulties, the church appointed Canadian Oliver R. Avison to run Chejungwon on July 16, 1893. Gwanghyewon was financed at first by the Korean government, while the medical staff was provided by the church. However, by 1894 when the First Sino-Japanese War and Gabo reforms (갑오개혁) took place, the government was not able to continue its financial support, thus management of Chejungwon came fully under the church. In 1899, Avison returned to the US and attended a conference of missionaries in New York City where he elaborated on the medical project in Korea. Louis Severance, a businessman and philanthropist from Cleveland, Ohio, was present and was deeply moved. He later paid for the major portion of the construction costs of new buildings for the medical facility. Chejungwon (제중원) was renamed Severance Hospital after him.

Chejungwon (later Severance Hospital) was primarily a hospital, but it also performed medical education as an attachment. The hospital admitted its first class of 16 medical students selected through examinations in 1886, one year after its establishment. By 1899, Chejungwon Medical School was independently recognized. Following the increase of diversity in missionary denominations in Korea, collaboration began to form. Chejungwon began to receive medical staff, school faculty, and financial support from the Union Council of Korean Missionaries (한국연합선교협의회; 韓國聯合宣敎協議會) in 1912. Accordingly, the medical school was renamed as Severance Union Medical College in 1913.

The rest of Yonsei University traces its origins to Chosun Christian College, which was founded on March 5, 1915, by an American Protestant missionary, Horace Grant Underwood sent by the church. Underwood became the first president, and Avison became the vice president. It was located at the YMCA. Courses began in April with 60 students and 18 faculty members.

Underwood died of illness on October 12, 1916, and Avison took over as president.

During World War I & II 

On August 22, 1910, Japan annexed Korea with the Japan–Korea Treaty of 1910. The first Governor-General of Korea, Terauchi Masatake, introduced the Ordinance on Chosun Education (조선교육령; 朝鮮敎育令) in 1911, and subsequently Regulations on Professional Schools (전문학교 규칙) and Revised Regulations on Private Schools (개정사립학교 규칙) in March, 1915. These were intended to stifle private education in Korea; any establishment of schools, any change in school regulations, location, purpose, coursework, or textbooks must all be reported to and authorized by the governor-general, and all courses must be in Japanese.

Severance Union College struggled to meet these requirements; school regulations and coursework were altered, faculty evaluated and enlarged, its foundation and its board clarified. It received its recognition as a professional medical school on May 14, 1917. In 1922 the governor-general Makoto Saito issued Revised Ordinance on Chosun Education (개정조선교육령). It called for stricter qualifications for the faculty, and Severance reacted obediently and further recruited more members with degrees from accredited institutions in North America and Europe. Japan did not completely ignore the competence of this institution; in 1923, Severance recovered its right to give medical licenses to its graduates without state examination, a right which had been lost since 1912. Moreover, in March 1934, the Japanese Ministry of Education and Culture further recognized Severance in allowing its graduates the right to practice medicine anywhere in Japanese sovereignty.

Oh Geung Seon (오긍선; 吳兢善) became the first Korean president of Severance in 1934.

Ordinances in 1915 and 1922 also affected the fate of Chosun Christian College. Intended as a college, it was not legally recognized as such, since the Ordinance of 1915 did not allow the establishment of Korean private colleges. Hence, Chosun Christian College, now renamed Yonhi College, was accepted only as a "professional school" on April 17, 1917, then a joint project from diverse missionary denominations. However, Yonhi had formed the organization and faculty becoming a university. It consisted of six departments: humanities, agriculture, commerce, theology (this department did not open due to differences among the founding denominations), mathematics and physics, and applied chemistry. The ordinances, furthermore, prohibited coursework in Korean history, its geography, or in the Bible outside the department of theology. The council of missionaries reacted with A Resolution on the Revised Educational Ordinance (개정교육령에 관한 결의문) which carefully pointed out that Japan did not apply such rigorous absurdities to its private schools in mainland Japan.

After the March First Independence Movement swept the peninsula in 1919, Japan somewhat relaxed its grip on Korea, and this is reflected in the Ordinance of 1922. It ceased the arbitrary control of governor-general over the coursework and the qualification of faculty members, and altered its stance on strict separation of religion from all education. It also recognized Yonhi as a professional school equal to its counterparts in Japan, and permitted the Christian programs and the Bible in its coursework. Nevertheless, Japanese literature became mandatory. Under Japanese intervention, Korean history was taught under the name Eastern History, and the Korean language was taught whenever possible.

The department of agriculture was closed after 1922 when its first graduates left Yonhi. Efforts were made to revive this department, without much success. However, Yonhi installed a training center for agricultural leaders on campus, with impressive results.

Yonhi was liberal in its admission of non-Christians. Its policy was to admit non-Christians relatively freely and allow the majority Christian students to gradually influence and assimilate them.

In the late 1930s, Japan again shifted its policy towards Korea to incorporate it to its scheme of expansionism. In August 1936, the new Japanese Governor-General Jirō Minami began the assimilation of Koreans, to exploit them for military purposes; The governor-general enforced Sōshi-kaimei and Shinto on Koreans, and began to recruit Koreans for Japanese war efforts. In April 1938, the third Ordinance on Chosun Education ordered the acceptance of Shinto, voluntary removal of Korean language in coursework, and further intensification of Japanese and Japanese history education. Yonhi Professional School did not follow suit and opened courses on the study of the Korean language in November 1938. This was not tolerated for long: In March 1940, Yonhi was forced to open courses in Japanese studies for each department and each year. In 1938, English classes began to come under pressure following a deterioration of relations between Japan and United States; coursework in English was forbidden and texts of English writers were censored. In 1938, President H.H. Underwood accepted the practice of Shinto to avoid Yonhi's potential closure. Governors-General pushed Yonhi to refuse financial support from United States and financial difficulties mounted.

On an individual level, Yonhi faculty members and its students were apprehended or investigated during this period for their involvement in real and alleged resistance movements.

In 1939, the United States government recalled all its citizens and missionaries in Korea; Underwood and some of the faculty refused to leave Korea until forced to in 1941–1942 following the outbreak of the Pacific War. Japanese military officers were dispatched to Yonhi for military training of its students in 1940 and forced labor began in 1941. Scientific equipment, building parts, and even the Underwood statue were seized. The school yard was turned into a drill ground. Due to their value in the war, medical students of Severance were not a target of "voluntary recruitment", but Severance faced Sōshi-kaimei, military training, and constant surveillance by the Japanese authorities. Severance was coerced into changing its name to Asahi (旭) in 1942.

On August 17, 1942, the board was dismissed and Yonhi was designated as enemy property, and thus appropriated and managed directly by an appointee of the governor-general. Yonhi ceased to be a place of education and was converted into a tool for assimilation of Koreans and exploitation of manpower. By October 1943, students were practically being conscripted. In 1944, dormitories were converted into barracks and the campus was occupied by the Japanese air force. Finally, on May 10, 1944, the Governors-General closed Yonhi and replaced it with Kyungsung Industrial Management School (경성공업경영학교), the primary purpose of which was to train engineers required to continue the war.

Both Severance and Yonhi were closely involved in Korean independence movements. Many faculty members were directly involved in the March First Independence Movement, as were their students. Severance continued its contribution by printing The Independence in the basement of one of its buildings, and Yonhi was as active as any other school. By the end of the movement, only 17 students were left. Yonhi students were active participants in the Chosun Student Council for Scientific Research (조선학생과학연구회), which was one of the leading groups in the Mansei Movement of June 10, 1926. The Yonhi Student Council and many faculty members belonging to the clandestine New Stem Association (신간회; 新幹會) gave full support to the Gwangju Student Independence Movement (광주학생독립운동). In the aftermath, students were apprehended, and the Shin Gan Society was exposed. Later on, students actively participated in V Narod movement (브나로드운동) and Student Enlightenment Movement (학생계몽운동) during 1929–1930.

Under Japanese oppression in the 1940s, the Yonhi School kept producing Koreans who fought for independence. In 1942, the Japanese Colonial Government of Korea arrested 33 Korean students of the Korean language, including three faculty members of Yonhi and prominent Korean language scholars, Choi Hyun Bae (최현배; 崔鉉培), Lee Yun Jae (이윤재; 李允宰), and Kim Do Yeon (金度演; 김도연), as well as other graduates of the school including Jung Tae Jin (정태진; 丁泰鎭) and Kim Yoon Kyung (김윤경; 金允經). They were charged with organizing the Joseon Language Society (조선어학회; 朝鮮語學會; now Korean Language Society; 한글학회; 한글學會), studying the Korean language, and attempting to publish a Korean-language dictionary. Lee Yun Jae died in jail in 1942 from torture and harsh treatment, eleven of the others were found guilty, and five including Choi Hyun Bae were imprisoned. The Japanese Colonial Court found them guilty because "behaviors such as publishing of a Korean-language dictionary is a form of nationality movement to maintain the spirit of Joseon."

Yun Dong-ju (윤동주; 尹東柱), a 1941 graduate of Yonhi School who joined the Korean independence movement, left many poems about patriotism and self-reflection. He was imprisoned by the Japanese, and died from torture and harsh treatment in 1945.

As tributes to their efforts, Yonsei University has constructed a monument called "Yonsei Hangultap" (A Monument for Korean Language by Yonsei; 연세 한글탑; 延世 한글塔), a monument for Yun Dong Ju (윤동주 시비; 尹東柱 詩碑), and bust statues of Choi Hyun Bae and Kim Yoon Kyung on its Seoul campus.

During the Korean War (1946–1952)
Severance was approved as a college by the liberated Korean government in 1947. Since most medical institutions in Korea were run by the Japanese, medical staff and faculty were in short supply after their departure. Thus, many members of Severance staff and faculty left to assist other institutions. Severance took up the role of student leadership and was outspoken against US-Soviet occupation. In 1950, during the outbreak of the Korean War, Severance functioned as a field hospital until Seoul was overrun. Severance fled hurriedly, but some faculty members and students were unable to leave in time; some were killed and others were captured then exploited by the advancing North Koreans. Severance seniors joined the military as army surgeons. Although Severance returned to Seoul for a while after its recapture, it had to flee again in December on a LST in Incheon.

When Severance arrived in Busan, its medical school joined the wartime college, a temporary body. Meanwhile, the Severance facility in Seoul received heavy damage, as it was in the center of the city near Seoul Station. Severance Hospital again returned on April 1, 1952, and its medical college on June 12, 1952.

The US military neglected the restitution of Yonhi and held other plans to use it as a military hospital or judiciary training center. With time, nevertheless, Yonhi came to be viewed as a missionary institution that was dispossessed by the governor-general.

Yonhi was able to open its doors again on January 21, 1946, and, on August 15, 1946, was recognized as a university. Baek Nak Jun became president. It was a period of transition, and Yonhi University faced obstacles including financial ones; after 1947, things settled down. At the time, Korea lacked teachers, and Yonhi was asked to provide education and training; the Temporary Training Center for Secondary School Teachers in Mathematics, Physics and Chemistry (임시 수물화학과 중등교원양성소) was established. In December 1948, plans for unification of Yonhi and Severance began to take form. The Graduate School was formed in July 1950.

At this point, all progress came to a halt due to the Korean War. The university suspended all courses on June 27 and recruited student soldiers. The North Korean military advanced into the Yonhi campus and established its headquarters there. This was a cause of severe damage to the campus when the US military recaptured Seoul in September. The university reopened following the recapture of Seoul, but it was once more on the run to Busan in December. In February 1951, Yonhi joined the wartime college; however, it kept an independent body and opened its own courses on October 3, 1951. On April 15, 1953, Yonhi began its work on restoration; Yonhi returned to its campus in the fall.

1953–1959

In 1957, Severance Medical College and Hospital and Yonhi University merged to form Yonsei University.

Academics

Reputation

Yonsei is one of Korea's three "SKY" universities, which are the most prestigious in the country, with the other members being Seoul National University and Korea University. Admission of these "SKY" universities is extremely competitive. Acceptance rate of Yonsei University in early admission(수시) is below 1%. In general, exhibiting 0.5% of academic achievement (Korean SAT) is needed to apply for Yonsei regular admission(정시).
Inside Korea, admission to a SKY university is widely considered as a determination of one's career and social status.

World rankings
Yonsei ranked 73rd in QS World University Rankings 2023, and 1st among private universities (12th overall) in QS Asia University Rankings 2023. Yonsei also ranked 78th in THE World University Rankings 2023, and 1st among private universities in Asia. In THE World University Rankings by Subjects, Yonsei ranked 1st among Korean Universities in four subjects which are Business & Economics, Social Sciences, Clinical & Health, and Psychology. In 2016, Yonsei University was ranked 105th overall, 24th in Social Policy and Administration, 12th in Modern Languages and 51–100 in economics by QS World University Rankings. It was ranked 104th worldwide and second in the nation by Center for World University Rankings in 2017 and in 2018 Academic Ranking of World Universities placed Yonsei University at the 20th position in Asia/Pacific region and third in South Korea. Yonsei was ranked 96th in the world according to an SCI paper published in 2007.

Yonsei is one of four Korean universities ranked in all three ARWU World University Ranking, QS World University Rankings, and The Times World University Ranking in 2010–13, along with Seoul National University, KAIST, and POSTECH). Yonsei University was ranked 16th in Asia in 2012 and continues to rise rapidly in global rank: 112 in the world in 2012; 129 in 2011; 142 in 2010; 151 in 2009; 203 in 2008; and ranked globally 236 in 2007 by QS World University Rankings. Yonsei was ranked the first Korean university to be in the Economists 2011 Top 100 Full-time MBAs (#76); US News, 2011 World's Best Universities: Asia #18; and UK Financial Times 2011 Top 100 EMBA (#57).

Yonsei University was ranked 36th in Reuters' "The world's most innovative university", which was announced in September 2015.

Colleges and programs

Undergraduate
 College of Liberal Arts
 College of Commerce and Economics
 School of Business
 College of Science
 College of Engineering
 College of Life Science and Biotechnology
 College of Computing
 College of Theology
 College of Social Sciences
 College of Music
 College of Human Ecology
 College of Science in Education
 University College
 Underwood International College
 College of Medicine
 College of Dentistry
 College of Nursing
 College of Pharmacy
 Global Leaders College

Postgraduate
 Graduate School (Sinchon Campus)
 United Graduate School of Theology
 Graduate School of International Studies
 Graduate School of Information
 Graduate School of Communication and Arts
 Graduate School of Social Welfare
 Graduate School of Business Administration
 Graduate School of Education
 Graduate School of Public Administration
 Graduate School of Engineering
 Graduate School of Journalism and Mass Communication
 Graduate School of Law
 Graduate School of Human Environmental Sciences
 Graduate School of Economics
 Law School
 Graduate School (Mirae Campus)
 Graduate School of Government and Business
 Graduate School of Health and Environment

Severance Hospital divisions
 Severance Hospital (Sinchon)
 Gangnam Severance Hospital
 Yongin Severance Hospital
 Songdo Severance Hospital (ynder xonstruction)
 Wonju Severance Christian Hospital

Notable international programs

Yonsei International Summer School
Yonsei International Summer School (YISS), usually held from late June to early August, started in 1985, and it has grown over 1,300 students from over 30 countries.

Winter Abroad at Yonsei
Winter Abroad at Yonsei (WAY) is a relatively new program, started 2013. The winter program is composed of two separate 3-week sessions which start in late December.

Study Abroad at Yonsei
Yonsei University's Exchange/Visiting Student Programs offer opportunities to students who plan to study for a year or a semester in Korea.

Culture

University symbols
The "ㅇ" and "ㅅ" in the University arms are derived from the first letters of "연세" ("Yonsei" in Korean).The circle "ㅇ" represents the ideal of a complete and well-rounded person, while the "ㅅ" symbolizes the upward-looking pursuit for scholarly excellence. In addition, the "ㅇ" stands for Heaven; the "-" represents the horizon of the Earth and "ㅅ" signifies "man," as expressed in the Chinese character (人). The open book stands for truth; the torchlight signifies freedom; and the arms, as a whole, protects these two core principles of the university.

The university's mascot is an eagle, and its color is "royal blue".

Christianity
Yonsei University is founded on Christian principles and purporting to "produce Christian leaders with the spirits of freedom and truth". The Christian character of the university is well illustrated by its history as a school founded by American Protestant missionaries and by its school motto from the Bible, "The truth will set you free" (John 8:32). As of 2007, the Board of Directors of Yonsei University should include a member from four Korean Christian organizations: The Presbyterian Church of Korea (대한예수교장로회), the Presbyterian Church in the Republic of Korea (한국기독교장로회), the Korean Methodist Church (기독교대한감리회), and the Anglican Church of Korea (대한성공회). In Korea and Japan, Christian schools founded by Christian organizations or individuals, especially by Western missionaries, such as Yonsei University, are commonly called mission schools.

A school's founding ideology and a student's freedom of religion has been debated in South Korean society for some time. As of 2009, a student does not have to be an active Christian to be admitted to Yonsei University.

In 2010, Yonsei University entered an agreement with The United Methodist Church, in which the university will serve as the regional office for the Methodist Global Education Fund for Leadership Development.

Student life
A large number of Yonsei degree programs, including UIC, ASD, and GSIS (in Seoul and YIC) have extensive tuition scholarships for international students that cover tuition and accommodation.

Akaraka is the official college festival for Yonsei students that is usually held on May. During the festival, many prominent singers and celebrities perform.

It is strictly forbidden by the university code of conduct to discriminate against students from non-Christian backgrounds, yet as a missionary school, Yonsei undergraduates are required to attend weekly chapel service for four semesters to qualify for graduation.

Clubs
There are more than 100 clubs at Yonsei University; the clubs listed here do not represent all clubs on campus.
 AFKN Listener's Club (ALC) is one of the largest and oldest Major Korean-International exchange student clubs in Yonsei University. Having the biggest club room in Yonsei, students in ALC play dramas and various activities with foreign students. The club is also famous for its featuring at Reply 1994: The club room characters spend their time is ALC's.
 Avenante is the only mixed choir in Yonsei University, composed of both music and non-music majors. Concerts are given twice a year. The club practices songs in many genres, from Missa Solemnis to pop songs to traditional Korean songs.
 Business Innovation Track (BIT) is a track aiming to foster innovative young generation regardless of the field they are studying.
 CogSci:In is a society studying cognitive science. There are four teams such as psychology, humanities and social science, applied science and neurobiology in CogSci:In. Each semester, two topics related to cognitive science are presented and each team makes a presentation every week about the topics. Members of CogSci:IN can get an integrated and in-depth understanding of each topic.
 The Global Management Track (GMT) is officially supported by the School of Business to systemically discover and train talented business major students. Founded in 1996, with the goal of globalization and a motto of passion, it has addressed many diverse topics worldwide and has increased the business competency of each of its individual members.
 International Yonsei Community (IYC) was founded in 1995 for global, multicultural exchange in the Yonsei society, including among the hundreds of students on campus from around the world. It upholds a universal idea of contributing to the worldwide foundation of wisdom and knowledge; overcoming cultural, racial and academic gaps; and promoting unity based on deep understanding.
 Junior Scholar Club (JSC) is an academic club founded in 1999 that aims to prepare students for academic and research-related careers. JSC consists of business, economics, and humanities & social science chapters for sophomores and above, and a preparatory chapter for freshmen students.
 The Yonsei Annals is the official English press of Yonsei University, founded in 1962. It is one of the top-rated English university monthly magazines in Korea and is run entirely by Yonsei University undergraduates. Many Annals alumni have gone on to careers in journalism, broadcasting, and politics. Annals alumni include former Minister of Foreign Affairs Kang Kyung-wha and KBS News 9 main anchor Min Kyung-wook among many others. Currently, the Annals publishes an issue every month. Each includes one or more column from the five divisions: Campus Reporting Division, Current Affairs, Photo, and Culture. The Annals is a nonprofit organization that is funded by the university. All decisions on content and day-to-day operations are made by the editorial board composed of the editor-in-chief and the editors of each divisions. There have been some occasions when guest editors were brought in to help develop the magazine.
 Yonsei Financial Leaders (YFL) is one of the largest and oldest finance clubs in Yonsei University, founded in 1998. It has a focus on fixed income, corporation valuation and derivatives. To date in Oct 2022, more than 500 alumni from YFL work in fields within finance including, and not limited to, investment banking, sales and trading, private equity, real estate, research, infrastructure.  
 Yonsei European Studies (YES). Initially organized by honorary editor-in-chief Siyoung Choi (Department of Law, Class of 08) under the name of Yonsei European Society or EU society in May 2011, the Yonsei European Studies Editorial Board publishes the South Korea's only and oldest ISSN-registered bilingual (Korean/English) undergraduate journal Yonsei European Studies or YES (ISSN 2287-450X). Since its first issue in August 2012, YES, featuring research papers on European and international affairs, has been delivered biannually to the National Library of Korea, Korea National Assembly Library, Yonsei University Library and highly selective libraries of US/UK universities and institutions.

Athletics
Yonsei University is a member of the Korea University Sports Federation (KUSF) and its men's football/soccer, men's basketball, baseball and men's ice hockey teams participate in the KUSF U-League. Its mascot is the eagle and its student-athletes are thus informally known as "Eagles".

Rivalry with Korea University

Each claiming to be the best private university in South Korea, Yonsei University and Korea University have had a long-standing athletic rivalry. The rivalry is well-illustrated by famous annual sports matches between them. This event, starting in 1925, is called KoYon Jeon (고연전; 高延戰) when Yonsei University hosts the matches and YonKo Jeon (연고전; 延高戰) when Korea University hosts the matches. However, the above official name is actually used only for official appearances such as broadcasting and newspaper reports. 'YonKo Jeon' is commonly used in Yonsei University and 'KoYon Jeon' is generally used in Korea University. The annual one-time matches include soccer, baseball, basketball, rugby, and ice hockey. With the founding of the U-League, the two institutions also meet in the league matches for all sports except rugby.

Many students in each university come to this event to cheer for their teams. Such the importance of athletic match-ups between the two universities in university culture that celebrities and professional athletes who are alumni have been spotted attending matches or referencing it in interviews.

Until 2012, Yonsei recorded 18 winning seasons, 8 draws, and 16 losses. In 2012, out of the five sports, Yonsei University lost three (baseball, basketball, soccer) and won two (ice hockey, rugby). In 2017, Yonsei university won all five games. In 2018, Yonsei university won three games (rugby, soccer and basketball) and lost one (ice hockey). Baseball was cancelled due to the rain. In 2020, all sports matches were cancelled due to the COVID-19 outbreak.

Campuses

Yonsei University Seoul Campus is composed of Sinchon Campus and International Campus in Songdo, Incheon. From 2011, Yonsei University adopted a Residential College (RC) Program at the Yonsei International Campus (YIC). Most freshmen of Yonsei University are required to live in an International Campus dormitory and complete RC programs for a year. After that, they move on to the Sinchon campus in Seoul to complete their education.

Sinchon Campus 

Yonsei's Sinchon Campus covers  located about 6 km off west of central Seoul. The Sinchon Campus is home to most of the academic departments of Yonsei University, and presents a beautiful combination of historical and high-tech buildings.

Yonsei International Campus (Songdo, Incheon)
Based on the May 8, 2006 agreement between the city of Incheon and Yonsei University, the Yonsei Songdo Global Academic Complex (now the Yonsei International Campus) is an anchor of the R&D aspect for the Songdo district and the Korean education and research industries. Construction was in two phases with the first phase including the Global Campus, Joint University Campus, R&D Campus, and the Global Academic Village. Phase one was completed in 2010 and phase two began the next year in 2011 with further expansion.

Currently, most freshmen of Yonsei University stay at the International Campus for one year to complete their RC program requirements. In addition to freshmen education, a number of academic programs are offered at the Yonsei International Campus, including undergrad and graduate programs offered from the School of Integrated Technology (College of Engineering), College of Pharmacy, Humanities, Arts, and Social Sciences Division (Underwood International College), Integrated Science and Engineering Division (Underwood International College).

The dormitory of the International Campus is composed of 12 houses. Until 2013, there were eight houses: Avison, Yun Dong-Joo, Muak, Yoongjae, Underwood, Baek Yang, Appenzeller (previously Aristotle), and Allen. In 2014, four more houses were founded: Evergreen, Wonchul, Chi Won, and Cheongsong.
 Evergreen House
 Wonchul House: Named after Lee Wonchul, alumnus of Yonsei University and first Korean medical doctor.
 Underwood House: Named after Horace Grant Underwood, the founder of Yonsei University.
 Yun, Dong-Joo House: Named after a famous poet, Yun Dong-Joo, a Yonsei University alumnus.
 Muak House: Named after the mountain near the Sinchon campus.
 Chi Won House: Chi Won is the name of the oldest building in Yonsei University (built in 1918).
 Yongjae House: Named after the first president of Yonsei University, Yongjae Baek Nak-jun.
 Avison House: Oliver R. Avison was a missionary who was the first to spread western medical knowledge in Korea and the founder of Severance Hospital.
 Baek Yang House: Named after the main street of the Sinchon campus (Baek Yang Ro)
 Cheongsong House: Cheongsong is the name of a forest at the Sinchon campus.
 Allen International House: Horace N. Allen is a medical missionary and founded Gwanghyewon, the first western-style hospital in Korea.
 Appenzeller International House: Formerly named after the philosopher Aristotle, it is now named Appenzeller International House.

Notable alumni

Business

 Koo Bon-moo (구본무): Former Chairman of LG Group
 Kim Woo-jung (김우중): Founder and CEO of Daewoo Group
 Baek Jong-won (백종원): CEO of The Born Group
 Suh Kyung-bae (서경배): Chairman of Taepyeongyang Corporation
 Song Ja (송자): Former President of Yonsei University and current CEO of Daekyo
 Chung Mong-hun (정몽헌): Former Chairman of Hyundai Group
 Lee Boo-jin (이부진): President and chief executive of Hotel Shilla (Samsung Group)
 Sang-Beom Han (한상범): CEO of LG Display
 Jung Suk Koh (고정석): CEO of Samsung C&T Corporation, a Fortune 500 company

Literature and arts
 Yun Dong-ju (윤동주): Poet and Korean independence movement activist
 Gi Hyeong-do (기형도): Poet
 Stephen Revere: Magazine editor and television personality
 Eun Hee-kyung: Novelist
 Kim Yoo-jung: Novelist
 Jang Cheol-mun: Poet
 Han Kang (한강): Novelist. The author of The Vegetarian, which won the 2016 Man Booker International Prize.

Politics, government, and public service
 Han Seung-soo (한승수) Former President of 56th United Nations General Assembly and Prime Minister of South Korea
 Kang Kyung-wha (강경화) Foreign Minister of South Korea
 Sydney A. Seiler The Special Envoy for the Six-Party Talks. Seiler coordinates U.S. efforts on denuclearization of North Korea through the Six-Party Talks framework and leads day-to-day engagement with Six-Party partners.

Academics
 T. K. Seung: philosopher and the Jesse H. Jones Professor in Liberal Arts, at the University of Texas at Austin
 Dean L. Hubbard: president of Northwest Missouri State University
 Jeong Han Kim (김정한): Mathematician, recipient of the 1997 Fulkerson Prize
 Yong Pil Rhee (이용필): Political systems scientist
 Sung-Mo Kang (강성모): President, KAIST
 Marvin Chun: Dean of Yale College

Sports
 Lee, Sung-gu (이성구) 1911-2002: "Father of Korean basketball", Olympian (1936 Berlin Olympics, basketball), posthumous recipient of the Yonsei University Award for Excellence (2017)
 Huh Jung-moo (허정무): Former soccer player and former head coach of Korean National Soccer team
 Jiyai Shin (신지애): Professional Golfer: 2007 KPGA Golfer of the Year and 2009 LPGA Tour money leader
 Chun Lee-kyung (전이경): Four-time Olympic Gold Medalist in Short Track Skating & Member of the International Olympic Committee Athletes' Commission
 Choi Dong-won (최동원): Former baseball pitcher of Lotte Giants
 Lee Sang-min (이상민): Basketball player of Seoul Samsung Thunders
 Lee Yu-bin: South Korean short track speed skater
 Kim Yong-dae (김용대): Soccer goalkeeper of FC Seoul
 Park Chul-soon (박철순): Former baseball pitcher of Doosan Bears
 Chang Woe-ryong (장외룡): Soccer manager of Omiya Ardija
 Ryu So-yeon: Professional golfer, winner of 2011 U.S. Women's Open
 Son Yeon-jae: first Korean rhythmic gymnast to win gold in the World Cup series ( at the 2014 Lisbon World Cup ) / fifth place in Gymnastics at the 2012 Summer Olympics – Women's rhythmic individual all-around
 Choi Min-jeong: South Korean short track speed skater who won a gold medal at PyeongChang 2018 Olympics
Seo Jang Hoon: Basketball player
Shin Dong-pa: Basketball player, was on the team that won the 1969 ABC Championship and the top scorer at the 1970 FIBA World Championship
 Heo Ung (허웅): Basketball player of Wonju DB Promy
 Heo Hoon (허훈): Basketball player of Suwon KT Sonicboom

Entertainment
 Ahn Jae-wook: Actor
 Ahn Ji-hyun: Actress
 Ahn Nae-sang: Actor
 Bae Chang-ho: Director
 : Singer
 Bong Joon-ho: Academy-award-winning director
 Choi Song-hyun: Actress
 Go Joo-won: Actor
 Han Jae-suk: Actor
 Han Jin-hee: Actor
 Horan: Singer (Clazziquai and Ibadi), radio DJ, and author
 Hur Jin-ho: Director
 Im Sang-soo: Director
 Jun Hyun-moo: Former KBS announcer; television host
 Kim Dong-ryool: Singer-songwriter (Exhibition)
 Kim Sung-kyung: Actress
 Kim Yong-gun: Actor
 Lee Ah-hyun: Actress
 Lee Sung-gang: Director
 Luhan (singer): Actor, singer
 Na Woon-gyu: Actor, screenwriter and director
 Na Young-seok: Producer, director
 Oh Sang-jin: News anchor and actor
 Park Gyu-young: Actress
 Park Heung-sik: Movie director
 Park Jin-hee: Actress
 Park Jin-young: Singer, actor, producer, founder of JYP Entertainment
 Park Romi: Singer and actress
 Park Sae-byul: Singer
 Shin Hyun-joon: Actor and professor
 Song Ok-sook: Actress
 Woo Hyun: Actor
 Yoo Yoonjin: Twitch Streamer
 Yoon Jong-shin: Singer-songwriter and host

See also
 List of colleges and universities in South Korea
 Education in South Korea
 Korea University–Yonsei University rivalry

References

The sections Beginnings, Under Japanese Rule (I), Under Japanese Rule (II): The War Machine, Liberation and the Korean War are largely based on 연세대학교백년사 100 Years of Yonsei University History, Yonsei University Press.

External links

 Home page
 Yonsei University: Official Seoul City Tourism

 
Christian universities and colleges
Universities and colleges in Seoul
Educational institutions established in 1885
1885 establishments in Korea
Association of Christian Universities and Colleges in Asia
Private universities and colleges in South Korea
Seodaemun District
Institute for Basic Science
19th-century architecture in Korea
20th-century architecture in South Korea